Kessleria albanica is a moth of the family Yponomeutidae. It is found in Serbia and Montenegro and Albania.

The length of the forewings is 7.5–7.8 mm. Adults have been recorded in July.

References

Moths described in 1960
Yponomeutidae
Moths of Europe